Andriana is both the name of the noble class and a title of nobility in Madagascar.

Andriana may also refer to:

Raisa Andriana (born 1990), Indonesian singer, songwriter, and occasional actress
Andriana Babali (born 1976), Greek singer and songwriter
Andriana Bânova (born 1987), Bulgarian triple jumper
Andriana Yordanova, Bulgarian-born soprano
3413 Andriana, an asteroid
Andriana (plant), a genus of plants in the family Apiaceae

See also
Adriana